İnlice may refer to:
İnlice, a town in Konya Province, Turkey
İnlice, Fethiye, a village and beach in Muğla Province, Turkey
İnlice, Sincik, a town in Adıyaman Province, Turkey